Biggar was a provincial electoral district for the Legislative Assembly of Saskatchewan, Canada. This former constituency, located in west central Saskatchewan, has an economy based primarily on mixed farming and alfalfa production, and oil production. Biggar is home to Prairie Malt Ltd. (the first malt plant in Saskatchewan) and is situated in the heart of Canada's prime barley-growing region. The Miller Western Palo Salt Mine is located 27 km west of Biggar. The 25 staff members produce sodium sulfate for shipping throughout Canada and the central United States. The major communities are Biggar (2,243), Wilkie (1,282) and Langham (1,145).

History

Riding
The riding was originally created for the 1912 general election and was abolished following the 1991 general election. Woodrow Stanley Lloyd of the Co-operative Commonwealth Federation (later the CCF-NDP) represented the riding from 1944 until 1971 and as Premier of Saskatchewan from 1961 to 1964.

This riding was re-created by the Representation Act, 2002 (Saskatchewan).  It is made up of areas of the Redberry Lake, Rosetown-Biggar, Battlefords-Cut Knife and Kindersley ridings.  Both the riding of Redberry Lake and the riding of Rosetown-Biggar were new ridings created by the Representation Act, 1994 (Saskatchewan).

Member of the Legislative Assembly

Prior to the 1999 Saskatchewan general election, when the Saskatchewan Party made inroads, people in this area of the province generally elected NDP and PC MLAs.

 Previous MLAs:
 Redberry Lake: Randy Weekes, Saskatchewan Party
 Rosetown-Biggar: Elwin Hermanson, Saskatchewan Party
 Battlefords-Cut Knife: Wally Lorenz, Saskatchewan Party
 Kindersley: Jason Dearborn, Saskatchewan Party

Election results

|-

|-

|NDP
|Lee W. Pearce
|align="right"|2,628
|align="right"|36.11%
|align="right"|–

|- bgcolor="white"
!align="left" colspan=3|Total
!align="right"|7,278
!align="right"|100.00%
!align="right"|

|-

|NDP
|Ken Crush
|align="right"|2,311
|align="right"|30.78%
|align="right"|-5.33

|- bgcolor="white"
!align="left" colspan=3|Total
!align="right"|7,507
!align="right"|100.00%
!align="right"|

References
Saskatchewan Archives Board – Election Results by Electoral Division

External links
Website of the Legislative Assembly of Saskatchewan

Former provincial electoral districts of Saskatchewan
Biggar, Saskatchewan